McDowell Technical Community College is a public community college in Marion, North Carolina. It is part of the North Carolina Community College System.

History
McDowell Technical Community College was founded in 1964 as a satellite of Asheville-Buncombe Technical Institute. In 1971, McDowell received its own independent charter becoming a separate community college. MTCC has since continued to expand to include new buildings and a walking trail in 2015. In 2018, the college opened a new laboratory to educate and train students for a myriad of careers in the health field

Academics
MTCC offers a wide range of degrees and certificates. There is also an adult education program.

References

External links
 Official website

1967 establishments in North Carolina
Education in McDowell County, North Carolina
North Carolina Community College System colleges
Educational institutions established in 1967
Two-year colleges in the United States
Marion, North Carolina